Discrespective is a New Zealand/Australian 3-disc ten-year anniversary compilation album of the Big Day Out music festival released in 2002.

Track listing

Disc one
"I Wanna Be Sedated" - The Ramones
"Good Fortune" - PJ Harvey
"Where The Wild Roses Grow" - Nick Cave and the Bad Seeds
"Human Behaviour" - Björk
"Generator" - Foo Fighters
"What's My Age Again?" - Blink-182
"Bottles to the Ground" - NOFX
"Your Are Not My Friend" - Frenzal Rhomb
"Pace It" - Magic Dirt
"Black Stick" - The Cruel Sea
"Caught By the Fuzz" - Supergrass
"Monty" - Spiderbait
"Happiness" - Regurgitator
"My Mind's Sedate" - Shihad
"Bullet" - Superheist
"Champion" - Grinspoon
"Greg! The Stop Sign" - TISM
"Go Go" - Ratcat

Disc two
"The Day You Come" - Powderfinger
"Special K" - Placebo
"Israel's Son" - Silverchair
"We're In This Together" - Nine Inch Nails
"Wild America" - Iggy Pop
"Jesus Built My Hotrod" - Ministry
"Links 2 3 4" - Rammstein
"Tribe" - Soulfly
"Chase The Dragon" - Beasts of Bourbon
"Soldiers" - You Am I
"If You Tolerate This Your Children Will Be Next" - Manic Street Preachers
"Soul Eater" - The Clouds
"D.C." - Died Pretty
"Stolen Car" - Beth Orton
"Yellow" - Coldplay
"Girl Trouble" - Violent Femmes
"Neva Mend" - Nokturn

Disc three
"Movin' Up" - Primal Scream
"Crystal" - New Order
"Red Alert" - Basement Jaxx
"The Rockafeller Skank" - Fatboy Slim
"Out of Control" - Chemical Brothers
"Breathe" - The Prodigy
"Television, The Drug of the Nation" - The Disposable Heroes of Hiphoprisy
"For The Love of It" - Salmonella Dub
"Black Steel" - Tricky
"Brown Paper Bag" - Roni Size
"E-Ville" - sonicanimation
"Born Slippy .NUXX" - Underworld

Music festival compilation albums
Compilation albums by New Zealand artists
2002 live albums
2002 compilation albums